School District 299 may refer to:
 Chicago Public Schools (officially City of Chicago School District #299)
 Caledonia Area Public Schools ISD 299